Chris Cimino (born April 27, 1961) is a meteorologist on WPIX "New York's very own" early morning show 4AM-6AM. Chris also hosts New York Living, a new lifestyle show on WPIX. 

Chris was the meteorologist on WNBC television's early-morning news program, Today in New York in New York City, New York, and was a substitute meteorologist for the NBC network's Today program.

He joined WNBC in December 1995 from WTXF-TV in Philadelphia, Pennsylvania, where he was the weekend meteorologist since January 1995.  Before that, Cimino worked as a meteorologist in the Cincinnati, Ohio, television market and on the radio with Compu-Weather and Metro Weather Service. and WROC-TV in Rochester, New York.

On September 20, 2004, Cimino was part of an incident in which he had to give a weather report dressed in a New York Yankees baseball costume (he is a lifelong New York Mets baseball fan). The idea came after Cimino lost a bet to his eleven-year-old neighbor  in which the Mets would have to win at least seventy-five games; the Mets were unsuccessful. The report ended with Cimino's colleague, sportscaster Otis Livingston, interrupting while dressed as the Mr. Met mascot, "beating up" Cimino.

During his time at WNBC he filled in for Al Roker on the Today Show, His quote to go to the local weather update was, "That was the look of the National Weather, Now here is your Local Forecast."

Cimino is a resident of East Brunswick Township, New Jersey.

His final day at WNBC was July 2, 2019. His replacement, Maria LaRosa started on July 29, 2019.

On January 6, 2022, WPIX, announced that Cimino will join PIX11 News as a meteorologist and lifestyle correspondent, effective immediately. He made his debut on January 17, 2022, during the PIX11 Morning News from 4-6 AM and will also contribute to a variety of lifestyle reports.

References

External links

Television meteorologists in New York City
New York (state) television reporters
People from East Brunswick, New Jersey
Living people
Scientists from New York (state)
1969 births